Strongylognathus dalmaticus is a species of ant in the genus Strongylognathus. It is endemic to Croatia.

References

Strongylognathus
Hymenoptera of Europe
Endemic fauna of Croatia
Insects described in 1969
Taxonomy articles created by Polbot